Knuckle Sandwich is a role-playing video game created by Andrew Brophy planned for release on macOS and Windows platforms. The story is about a boy who moves out of home and starts looking for work in a new city. After landing a job at a run-down diner, he accidentally gets wrapped up in a missing persons mystery that involves a ludicrous gang and a fanatical cult. The gameplay combines fast-paced minigames with turn-based combat.

Further reading

External links 
 

Upcoming video games
Role-playing video games
Indie video games
MacOS games
Windows games
Single-player video games
Video games developed in Australia
Video games about cults